Organic Process Research & Development is a peer-reviewed scientific journal published since 1997 by the American Chemical Society. Its publication frequency switched from bimonthly to monthly in 2012. It is indexed in Chemical Abstracts Service, Scopus, EBSCOhost, British Library, and Web of Science. The current editor-in-chief is Kai Rossen. According to the Journal Citation Reports, the journal has a 2017 impact factor of 3.584.

References

External links 
 

American Chemical Society academic journals
Monthly journals
Publications established in 1997
English-language journals
Pharmaceutical sciences